Orientin is a flavone, a chemical flavonoid-like compound. It is the 8-C glucoside of luteolin.

Natural occurrences 
Orientin is found in Adonis vernalis, in Anadenanthera colubrina and Anadenanthera peregrina, and in the Phyllostachys nigra bamboo leaves

 In food
Orientin is also reported in the passion flower, the Açaí palm, buckwheat sprouts, and in millets.

Identification in Natural Plants 
The identification of orientin has been reported widely. Its identification using mass spectrometry is established

See also 
Isoorientin (or homoorientin) is the luteolin-6-C-glucoside.

References

External links 
 Orientin on rdcheicals.com

Flavone glucosides
Flavone glycosides
C-glycoside natural phenols